Paul Andrews (born 17 May 1958), better known by his stage name Paul Di'Anno, is a British heavy metal singer who was the lead vocalist for Iron Maiden from 1978 to 1981. In his post-Maiden career, Di'Anno has issued numerous albums over the years, as both a solo artist and as a member of such bands as Gogmagog, Di'Anno's Battlezone, Praying Mantis, Killers, and Rockfellas.

Career

Iron Maiden (1978–1981) 
Di'Anno was born and grew up in Chingford, East London. Because of his Brazilian father, Di'Anno holds dual British and Brazilian citizenship. He spent his teenage years singing in various rock bands and working as a butcher in Station Road and as a chef in hotels and restaurants.

According to Iron Maiden's The History of Iron Maiden – Part 1: The Early Days DVD, he was introduced to the band by drummer Doug Sampson, an old friend of Harris' from his days in the band Smiler. It was around this time that he first adopted the stage name Di'Anno, which he would later use to claim Italian descent. Their first audition with Rod Smallwood reputedly failed when Di'Anno was arrested for showing off his pocket-knife in public.

The band's 1980 self-titled release quickly became acknowledged as a classic of its genre, as the band merged punk's energy with metal's riffs and progressive rock complexity, serving as the blueprint for such future genres as thrash metal and speed metal and influencing later progressive metal bands. 1981 saw the release of their second album, Killers, as well as a stopgap live EP, Maiden Japan.

After cancelling gigs due to Di'Anno's lack of desire and inability to perform (from cocaine/amphetamine abuse and heavy drinking), Iron Maiden decided that to progress they would have to find a singer capable of being on tour. They found a replacement in former Samson frontman Bruce Dickinson. Di'Anno's last show with the band was on 10 September 1981 at the Odd Fellow's Mansion in Copenhagen, Denmark. In 1981, Di'Anno left Iron Maiden after a meeting with the band and their manager Rod Smallwood. In Di'Anno's words: "It's like having Mussolini and Adolf Hitler run your band. Because it is Rod Smallwood and Steve Harris and that's it. There can't be anyone else and my character is too strong for that so me an' Steve was always fighting".
Di'Anno was paid out by Smallwood at the time of his departure and does not receive royalties on Iron Maiden songs.

Di'Anno (1983–1985) 

Di'Anno was the first project by Paul Di'Anno after he was fired from Iron Maiden. This group was originally called Lonewolf but after disagreement with a group already called Lone Wolf, they changed their name and ended up recording only one album under the simple moniker of Di'Anno. On the tour Di'Anno played Remember Tomorrow from his catalogue of Iron Maiden songs, along with their own songs and a few other covers (most notably The Kinks' "You Really Got Me," and "Don't Let Me Be Misunderstood"). Having limited success, the six-piece band disbanded shortly after they were done touring. The only other recordings available from this band are a single of "Heartuser", a Japanese single of "Flaming Heart" and a Sweden-only VHS release called Live at the Palace (also available on DVD as Di'Anno Live from London). During the latter performance, the band played an unreleased song entitled "Spiritual Guidance", which Paul told the audience would be on the band's forthcoming album. This album was never recorded.

Last known line-up:
Paul Di'Anno – lead vocals
Lee Slater – guitars, vocals
P. J. Ward – guitars, vocals
Kevin Browne – bass, vocals
Mark Venables – keyboards, vocals
Frank Noon – drums (replacing Dave Irving from the album line-up who in turn replaced Mark Stewart)

Gogmagog (1985) 
In 1985, Di'Anno joined a project that was intended to be a supergroup. The group, called "Gogmagog" (see the Biblical book Ezekiel 38:1–2), was put together by DJ and record producer Jonathan King, best known for discovering the group Genesis in the late 1960s. King assembled a star-studded lineup featuring Di'Anno, drummer Clive Burr, guitarists Janick Gers and Pete Willis and bassist Neil Murray, but the members became increasingly frustrated by a policy that forbade them from writing any original material. Gogmagog released a three-song E.P. on the independent Food For Thought label in 1985 entitled I Will Be There, with Russ Ballard writing the title song and producer King writing the other two songs. Although reviews were generally positive, the EP did not chart and the group disbanded after King began to lose interest in the project. Di'Anno has been completely dismissive of the short-lived project, referring to it as "nothing" and claiming he only got involved for the money.

Battlezone (1985–1989, 1998) 
After the breakup of his self-titled band, Di'Anno formed Strike with DeeRal (guitar) who recruited drummer Bob Falck (who had used the name Sid Falck while playing drums in Overkill) and the Hurley brothers John (second guitar) and Chaz (bass). The project was eventually named Battlezone, after a name straight from a comic book, upon the vocalist's return to Britain in 1985. 1986 saw the enrollment of former Lonewolf and Tokyo Blade guitarist John Wiggins.

The band's initial line-up comprised Di'Anno, guitarists John Wiggins and John Hurley, bassist Laurence Kessler and Adam Parsons on drums. Di'Anno had previously known guitarists John Wiggins and John Hurley from bands such as Deep Machine and Iron Cross. Parsons had gone under the stage name A.D. Dynamite whilst in Aunt May. However, Parsons left shortly after to replace Vince Hoare in the London-based glam band Belladonna (formed by former Hell's Belles vocalist Paul Quigley, with Paul Lewis, Jeff Fox and Neil Criss) and Falck reappeared on the scene in time together with Danish bassist Pete West (Peter Vester) to record the band's first album Fighting Back, written entirely by John Hurley, except the title track which was credited to Bob Falck.

Battlezone performed a club tour of America in 1987 to promote the début Fighting Back, but musical differences, arguments and physical fights within the band led to the departure of John Hurley and Bob Falck after the first tour. According to Di'Anno's book The Beast, Hurley had become an "egomaniac" and the drummer Falck a "liability", so they were thrown out the band. Their places were taken by ex-Persian Risk members Graham Bath and Steve Hopgood respectively, following the tour's completion.

The second album to be released was entitled Children of Madness, and it featured a track entitled "Metal Tears", which is about a man who was unable to have a steady relationship and built a female robot, who he subsequently fell in love with. The original idea came from a book titled Clone. However, the track received criticism from the media for being very similar to a track (entitled "London") on Queensrÿche's Rage for Order album.

"Guitarist Graham Bath, who had been recruited to play second guitar, wasn't enthusiastic about touring, so he was fired from the band. Pete West, recommended a replacement Alf Batz, who joined just in time to go to New York for the video shoot." The video for "I Don't Wanna Know" was played in rotation on MTV in the US.

Drugs and infighting again put a strain on the band. Towards the end of the final tour, most members had quit leaving Di'Anno to complete the tour with a backing band in order to fulfil his contract.

Subsequently, American guitarist Randy Scott, along with Dave Harman on guitar and Eddie Davidson on bass, signed up with Battlezone. However, the band were without proper management and disbanded shortly after. Battlezone played their last concert on 10 December 1989, at Dynamo Open Air in Eindhoven, Netherlands .

Following the breakup of Battlezone, Di'Anno and Hopgood formed the power metal band Killers, releasing four albums. Hurley would later form glam rock band L.O. Girls and release the "Twelve Bore Honeymoon" single in 1990 and "Just Can't Say I Love You" in 1993. During 1990, Di'Anno fronted Praying Mantis for a tour of Japan, which was recorded for the subsequent Live at Last album release with ex-Iron Maiden guitarist Dennis Stratton. Wiggins joined a reformed Tokyo Blade in 1995.

By 1998, Di'Anno had resurrected the name Battlezone. Joining him were Wiggins and fellow ex-Tokyo Blade members bassist Colin Riggs and drummer Marc Angel. Second guitars were supplied by the Brazilian Paulo Turin. This line-up cut the album Feel My Pain, released by the fledgling "Zoom Club" label. Working titles for the album included "Spoon Face" and "Smack", both containing references to heroin use. The album had a heavier edge compared to the first two Battlezone albums. The band undertook a sold-out Brazilian tour in January 1998, with erstwhile Killers colleagues bassist Gavin Cooper and guitarist Nick Burr joining on this South American tour.

The band toured Brazil in the same year playing a three-week tour to sold-out audiences up to 6000 fans a night. Being brought back down to earth, Battlezone upon their return home put on a gig at the Walthamstow Royal Standard with an audience of only a hundred or so and a gig at JB's Dudley in the West Midlands attracting fewer than a dozen fans. A live track from the Walthamstow gig later appeared on a compilation of all three Battlezone albums, entitled Cessation of Hostilities. Ex-Battlezone bassist Gavin Cooper joined Lionsheart in December 2004, then moved onto Statetrooper in May 2005. The bassist subsequently joined the ranks of Magnum singer Bob Catley's solo band for UK dates in April 2006.

In mid-2008, a Battlezone compilation entitled The Fight Goes On was released as on the Phantom Sound & Vision label as a 3-CD box set featuring all three Battlezone studio albums.

Last known line-up:
Paul Di'Anno – Vocals
Johnny "Bravo" Wiggins – Guitars (1985–89, 1998–99)
Paulo Turin – Guitars (1998–99)
Colin Riggs – Bass (1998–99)
Mark Angel – Drums (1998–99)

Former/past member(s):
DeeRal – Guitars (1985)
John Hurley – Guitars (1985–87)
Graham Bath – Guitars (1987)
Alf Batz – Guitars (1987–89)
Randy Scott – Guitars (1989)
Dave Harman – Guitars (1989)
Nick Burr – Guitars (1998)
Chaz Hurley – Bass (1985–86)
Peter Vester – Bass (1986-88) listed as "Pete West" on the back covers of "Fighting Back" and "Children of Madness")
Eddie Davidson – Bass (1989)
Gavin Cooper – Bass (1998)
Bob "Sid" Falck – Drums (1986–87)
J. Michael D.- Drums
Steve Hopgood – Drums (1987–89)

Praying Mantis (1990) 
After being dropped by BMG, Praying Mantis disbanded. Then, in a Spinal Tap-ish twist of fate, Paul Di'Anno called Dennis Stratton in 1989, about the Japanese wanting to have a ten-year anniversary of the new wave of British heavy metal. The band found themselves enjoying a renaissance in Tokyo, Japan, prompting a reformation and tour in April 1990, which yielded the Live at Last LP.

Killers (1990–1997, 2001–2003) 

Killers was formed back in the summer of 1991. Cliff Evans was living in New York with Arnie Goodman, the manager of Fastway. Steve Hopgood, who played in Battlezone with Di'Anno previously, called Evans and outlined his plans for a new band. Di'Anno and Hopgood flew over to New York from the U.K. where they formed a band.

Within a few days, Killers had hired John Gallagher (from Raven) to play bass on a short-term basis. Former member of Drive She Said and New York session player Ray Detone was brought in on second guitar.

Shortly afterward, a live album called Assault on South America was recorded, featuring a number of Iron Maiden and Battlezone tracks and covers of "We Will Rock You" and "Smoke on the Water". This was funded by Rock in Rio promoter Carlos Genesio and to be released primarily for the South American market. "Recorded in Brazil, Argentina and Venezuela in Summer of 1993" is splashed on the back cover. However, according to John Gallagher, the South American tour fell through so the entire album was recorded on a mobile recording truck in New York. Later, a Canada-based record company called Magnetic Air Productions issued a pirate (bootleg) release worldwide, under a different cover, with no royalties being paid to the band.

Killers then played two days of showcases at Arnie Goodman's New York City studio for several major record companies including Virgin, EMI, Sony and BMG. Representatives flew into New York from all over the world to see Killers play. They played only Iron Maiden songs because the band had not written any material. Maiden songs played included "Phantom of the Opera" and "Wrathchild" which evidently impressed a BMG representative enough to give the band a $250,000 contract. BMG were unaware that these songs had been recorded previously.

Once Killers had the record deal, they started to write the first album entitled Murder One. Rob Fraboni was recruited to produce the record. The band moved to Binghamton, where they stayed in a motel in which the owner had a set up rehearsal studio. The album was written in about in two weeks. Fraboni then took Killers to White Crow Audio (Burlington, Vermont) to record the drums which took about half a day. Finally, vocals and final mixing were performed at The Powerstation in New York.

Nick Burr left Killers after the completion of Murder One and was replaced by former Battlezone and Persian Risk guitarist Graham Bath who had also briefly played in Battlezone. For the next 18 months the band toured around the world playing to fans all over Europe, Japan and coast to coast across the USA.

After the tour of Murder One, Killers returned to the UK while Di'Anno stayed in the US. Around this time, Di'Anno married an English girl, whom he flew into New York. Drugs and alcohol took their toll and the marriage quickly fell apart. Di'Anno left New York and moved in with his new American girlfriend in L.A. A fight between him and her involving a knife caught the attention of the police, who came into the apartment and arrested him for spousal abuse, cocaine possession and firearms offences. After a court appearance, he was sentenced to spend four months in an L.A. jail and Di'Anno was branded by the judge as a 'menace to society'. It was here that Di'Anno began writing songs for the next Killers album and posting tapes back and forth to the UK, where the band were now living.

Di'Anno returned to the UK after being deported. It was here that the band was already signed to Bleeding Hearts records located in Newcastle, where they recorded their second studio album, entitled Menace to Society. The album had a more groove/thrash metal sound, and some critics compared this album to the works of Pantera and Machine Head. It was poorly received by many critics with the exception of Metal Hammer magazine in Germany who voted it as the "Best New Album" for that year.

By 2003, Di'Anno and Cliff Evans went on tour as the only original members of Killers remaining. Di'Anno hired new musicians whom he remembered from touring in Germany and Austria. Marcus Thurston joined the band as second guitarist, Darayus Kaye took over bass duties and Pete Newdeck on drums. Steve Hopgood had to retire as he developed tinnitus in his ears. The guitarist Graham Bath damaged his hands from playing so much over the years and developed arthritis. According to Di'Anno, he wanted Clive Burr (ex-Iron Maiden) on drums, but he could not get to rehearsals in time. Later on, Burr was to become severely ill from multiple sclerosis and died in 2013.

By 2004, Killers had disbanded. Cliff Evans, the former Killers guitarist and last original member of the band apart from Di'Anno, subsequently formed his own record company called Soundhouse Records and re-released the entire Killers back catalogue with the addition of another live album entitled Killers Live at the Marquee in 2008. Murder One album was reissued with 2 acoustic bonus tracks – "Wrathchild" and "Dreamkeeper". Following this, Paul Di'Anno made both Killers studio albums available for download free of charge through his own website. Following legal action, Evans was forced to cease selling any Killers material on his label.

In December 2013, Paul Di'Anno and Cliff Evans announced that the band would regroup and release a new album entitled The Lazarus Syndrome. Producer Phil Kinmanm who had worked on Tank's album War Nation was announced to be involved with the new project.

Last known line-up
Paul Di'Anno – Vocals (Di'Anno, ex-Battlezone, ex-Gogmagog (UK), ex-Iron Maiden)
Cliff Evans – Guitars (Chicken Shack, Headfirst, Tank)
Graham Bath – Guitars (Persian Risk, Sphinx)
Brad Wiseman – Bass
Steve Hopgood – Drums (ex-Battlezone, ex-Chinatown, ex-Jagged Edge, Persian Risk, Shy, Tank, Wild)

Former/past member(s)
John Gallagher – Bass (1991–1992) (Raven)
Ray Ditone – Guitars (1991–1992)
Nick Burr – Guitars (1992) (ex-Battlezone, ex-Idol Rich, ex-Tyrant, now Bad Back Band)
Gavin Cooper – Bass (1992–1994) (ex-Battlezone)

Nomad / Di'Anno (1999–2001, 2003–2008) 
Following the demise of the new Battlezone unit put together in 1998, Di'Anno teamed up with expat Brazilian guitarist Paulo Turin and lived in São Paulo during 2000. A new band was created initially under the banner of "Nomad" and featured an all Brazilian line up. It was economically and logistically preferable for Di'Anno to live in Brazil during this period, in order to tour South America and release a self-produced album pleasing to that particular market. The album was distributed by Perris Records. However, complete worldwide distribution was not achieved.

The album was repackaged and released as The Living Dead. The package included a DVD video for the title track. This was recorded in the East London Docks and directed by Swedish director Mats Lundberg from Doom Films, who went to London to work on the concept with Di'Anno's manager Lea Hart. All of the special effects were added in Sweden and the story line was based on the lyrics and message of the song. Few previously released live Iron Maiden tracks were also added to the CD.

RockFellas (2008–2010) 

Late 2008, Di'anno relocated to the southeast of Brazil and toured with a new band/project named RockFellas with three Brazilian musicians: Jean Dolabella (drummer) ex-Diesel/Udora/Sepultura, Marcão (guitarist) of Charlie Brown Jr. and Canisso of Raimundos/ex-Rodox, playing rock & roll and metal classics. There, he was nicknamed "Paulo Baiano" ("Paulo" = Paul in Portuguese, Baiano = Who was born in Bahia), being the "Paulo Baiano" nickname a pun/joke, for his name, Paul Di'Anno, is pronounced in a very similar way to the nickname above.

Norwegian live band (2008–present) 
Early 2008, Di'Anno toured Norway and later Eastern Europe in 2009 with an all-Norwegian backing band consisting of musicians Henrik "Rick" Hagan (drums), Are Gogstad (bass), Jon Vegard Naess (guitar) and Anders Buaas (guitar).
Anders Buaas was later replaced by guitarist Rikard Nilsen.
The band went on to do several tours of Sweden, and made festival appearances at Hard Rock Hell (Wales, UK 2013), Voxbotn (Faroe Islands, Denmark 2013), Tons of Rock (Halden, Norway 2014), Sweden Rock Festival (Norje, Sweden 2014) and Rock Against Narcotics (Pune, India 2015), before doing a tour of Sweden in the summer of 2015.
The band has also toured with Blaze Bayley and Tim Ripper Owens.

Present 
Di'Anno was, before being jailed in March 2011, recording a new solo album with Paulo Turin, the guitarist who worked on Feel My Pain and Nomad. The album was being produced by Dieter Roth in his studio in Germany. However, work on the album ceased due to record company problems.

He maintained an extensive world tour schedule, including two recent trips through America where traditional metal band Icarus Witch served as both his opening and backing band. In June 2012, Di'Anno was given the Freedom of the City of Bariloche in Argentina for charitable work carried out several years ago.

In 2014, Di'Anno sang on lead vocals on the bonus track "Fuck You All" on the album Big Trouble by hard rock band Hollywood Monsters. The album was released in 2014 on Mausoleum Records and featured Steph Honde on vocals and guitars, Vinny Appice on drums, Tim Bogert on bass and Don Airey on keyboards.

In August 2014, Di'Anno has scrapped his retirement plans and released a new album with his new band, Architects of Chaoz, called The League of Shadows.

In 2015, he returned to Brazil on his tour "The Beast is Back", saying that this would be his last in the country. In this tour, the singer was accompanied by musicians from Rio de Janeiro, Vinnie Tex (guitar), Thiago Velasquez (bass) and drummer Braulio Drumond; they currently part of the North American Leather Leone's band. Di'Anno made eight presentations around the country. These members would be part of the new band, however due to health problems, the singer had to pause activities and the project in standby.

The same year, Di'Anno was interviewed extensively for the book Iron Maiden: 80 81, by author Greg Prato.

In May 2016, Di'Anno was hospitalized for undisclosed medical issues and was forced to cancel his previously announced June 2016 tour of Brazil. According to the tour's promoter, Blog n Roll Produções, Di'Anno is undergoing a series of tests to help ensure an accurate diagnosis and identify an appropriate course of treatment.

On 29 October 2017, Di'Anno joined The Iron Maidens on stage for their encore at the O2 Academy in Islington, London, performing Wrathchild and Iron Maiden. Di'Anno appeared in a wheelchair.

Di'Anno was due to make his final performance on 30 August 2020 at the Beermageddon Festival in Bromsgrove, England before he retired from touring, though he has not clarified on whether he will continue to record music. This appearance was cancelled due to the COVID-19 pandemic, with the festival dates rescheduled for August 2021. However, on 7 June Paul and the Ides of March band were removed from the line up with the following statement: "We here at Beermageddon are gutted to announce Ides of March will no longer be appearing at this years festival, we had been struggling to contact the band or management and just over a week ago had the news that the planned project will not be going ahead and as such the band will not appear at Beermageddon 2021. We were so looking forward to Paul Di'Anno and a lineup of past Iron Maiden members gracing the Geddon stage, it would have been one of the most memorable festival appearances we have ever had, but sadly it isn't to be. I know many of you had huge anticipation for Di'Anno's farewell show, and we feel your pain, but we do promise Beermageddon will still be the fantastic festival it always is."

On 21 May, 2022, Di'Anno performed his first live show in 7 years with the Norwegian live band at Bikers Beer Factory in Zagreb, Croatia.

Autobiography 
Di'Anno has released an autobiography titled The Beast. The book includes a chapter of stories and comments regarding Di'Anno written by former bandmates including Dennis Stratton, John Wiggins and Steve Hopgood. The book was controversial for its portrayal of his abuse of various drugs, many accounts of Di'Anno's violence towards people, and the explanation of his ban from America.

Singing style 
In comparison to the operatic vocals of his successor in Iron Maiden, Di'Anno is remembered for having a more guttural "punk" sound to his singing, in part because he began his singing career in punk band the Paedophiles. He usually sang with a raspy and rougher sound, although he was capable of singing with a purer voice as demonstrated by slower numbers like "Remember Tomorrow", "Strange World" and "Prodigal Son".

Later in his career Di'Anno's style, along with his music, became darker and more aggressive as Iron Maiden evolved into a more progressive outfit.

Other interests 
Di'Anno has had several businesses outside of the music industry, including an internet café and a hotel/restaurant in England, both of which he sold. He was last resident in Salisbury, Wiltshire.

Personal life 
In February 2011, Di'Anno was convicted on eight counts of benefit fraud for claiming more than £45,000 under false pretenses. On 11 March 2011, he was jailed for nine months at Salisbury Crown Court. He only served two of the nine months to which he was sentenced, being released early for good behaviour.

Di'Anno's religious affiliation is made uncertain by his own words; he has given interviews that contradict each other on this subject, perhaps as a practical joke. He has a tattoo on the back of his head that says "666" and "GOD = SUCKER". According to his autobiography, he converted to Islam in the 1990s after reading the Qur'an. However, he has subsequently reversed that position, saying "I think religion kills everybody. I don't believe in it.... No, my father was a Muslim, I must admit. But I don't give a fuck." In later interviews Di'Anno clarifies that he never was a true Muslim, that he never stopped drinking, but tried to become a better person by applying some of the Muslim philosophies to his life. His autobiography furthers the confusion, in various passages he claims to be Muslim, Catholic, Jewish, and Aborigine.

Di'Anno has been married five times and has six children.

A crowdfunder was launched in January 2021 to help raise money for the singer's knee surgery, following several years of poor health. In September 2021, it was reported that Di'Anno was still waiting for the surgery, and a photo surfaced of the singer showing his badly swollen leg. In October 2021, the crowdfunding had reached its target to which Di'Anno heartily thanked everyone for their support. As of November 2021, Di'Anno has relocated to Croatia to undergo treatment and surgery for his knee.

Discography

with Iron Maiden 
The Soundhouse Tapes (1979)
Iron Maiden (1980)
Live!! +one (1980)
Killers (1981)
Live at the Rainbow (1981)
Maiden Japan (1981)
12 Wasted Years (1987)
The First Ten Years (From There to Eternity) (1990)
Best of the Beast (1996)
Ed Hunter (1999)
BBC Archives (2002)
Best of the 'B' Sides (2002)
The History of Iron Maiden – Part 1: The Early Days (2004)
The Essential Iron Maiden (2005)

with Di'Anno 
Live at the Palace (VHS, 1984)
Di'Anno (1984)
"Flaming Heart" (1984)
"Heartuser" (1984)
Nomad (2000)
Live at the Palace, recorded in 1984 (DVD, 2005)

Solo 
The World's First Iron Man (1997)
As Hard as Iron (1997)
Beyond the Maiden (Compilation, 1999)
The Masters (Compilation, 1999)
The Beast (Live, 2001)
The Beast in the East (Live, 2003 DVD)
The Living Dead (2006)
The Maiden Years – The Classics (Compilation, 2006)
Iron Maiden Days & Evil Nights (Compilation, 2007)
Wrathchild – The Anthology (Compilation, 2012)
The Beast Arises (DVD, 2014)
Hell Over Waltrop – Live In Germany ,Recorded in 2006)  (Live, 2020)

with Battlezone 
Fighting Back (1986)
Children of Madness (1987)
Warchild (Compilation 1988)
Feel My Pain (1998)
Cessation of Hostilities (Compilation with all three studio albums Battlezone released + Children of madness demo tracks and one new live track, 2001)
The Fight Goes On (Boxset including all three Battlezone studio albums, 2008)
Paul Di’Anno’s Battlezone: Killers In The Battlezone (1986-2000) (3 CD Box Set, 2022)

with Killers a.k.a. Paul Di' Anno & Killers 
Murder One (1992)
South American Assault Live (1994)(Recorded on summer, 1993)
Menace to Society (1994)
Live (1997)
New Live & Rare (1998)
Killers Live at the Whiskey (2001)(Recorded Whisky a Go Go, Los Angeles,2000)
Screaming Blue Murder – The Very Best of Paul Di'Anno's Killers (2002)

with Gogmagog 
I Will Be There EP (1985)

with Dennis Stratton 
The Original Iron Men (1995)
The Original Iron Men 2 (1996)
Hard As Iron (compilation) (1996)

with Praying Mantis & Paul Di'Anno, Dennis Stratton 
Live at Last (1991) (Recorded at Nakano Sunplaza, Tokyo, 18 April 1990)

with The Almighty Inbredz 
The Almighty Inbredz (1999)

with Architects of Chaoz 
League of shadows (2015)

on compilations 
Metal for Muthas (with Iron Maiden, 1980)
Kaizoku (1989, Song: "Danger on the Street II")
All Stars Featuring The Best Of British Heavy Metal & Heavy Rock Musicians (1991, Song "She is danger")
True Brits (1993)
True Brits 2 (1994)
True Brits 3 (1995)
Rock Hard Hard Rock (1994, Songs: "No Repair", "She goes down")
X-Mas: The Metal Way (1994)
Killer Voices (1995)
Metal Monsters (1996)
Metal Christmas a.k.a. The 21st Century Rock Christmas Album (1996)
Hard 'n' Heavy Rock (2001, Song: "Lights Out")
Wacken Rocks (2001, Song: "Wrathchild (live)")
Classic Rock, Classic Rockers (2002)
Metal Masters – Killers (2005, Song: "Killers")
Rock Hard – Das Festival (2007, Song: "Prowler (live)")
The Many Faces of Iron Maiden – Journey Through The Inner World of Iron Maiden (2016)

on tribute albums 
In The Name Of Satan – A Tribute To Venom (1998) (with Killers: "Black Metal")
666 The Number One Beast (Iron Maiden Tribute) (1999)
666 The Number One Beast Volume 2 (Iron Maiden Tribute) (1999)
The Maiden Years (Iron Maiden Tribute) (2000)
Gimme all your Top (ZZ Top Tribute) (2000) (Song: "Sleeping Bag")
The Boys are back (Thin Lizzy Tribute) (2000) (Song: "Killer On the Loose")Only UFO can rock me (UFO Tribute) (2001) (Song: Shoot Shoot)Another Hair of the Dog (Nazareth Tribute) (2001) (Songs: "Hair Of The Dog" and "Broken Down Angel")Hangar de Almas: Tributo A Megadeth (2005) (Song: "Symphony Of Destruction")Numbers from the Beast – An All Stars Tribute to Iron Maiden (2005) (Song: "Wrathchild")World's Greatest Metal – Tribute to Led Zeppelin (2006) (Song: "Kashmir")An '80s Metal Tribute to Van Halen (2006) (Song: "Ain't Talkin' 'Bout Love")A Tribute to The Rolling Stones (2007) (Songs: "I Wanna Be Your Man" and "Jumpin' Jack Flash")Top Musicians Play The Rolling Stones (2010) (Song: "Paint It Black")Thriller – A Metal Tribute To Michael Jackson (2013) (Song: "Bad")Tribute to Rod Stewart and The Faces II (2015) (Songs: "Hot Legs" and "Cindy Incidentally")

 Guest appearances English Steel: Start 'em young (1993, Song: "She goes down")English Steel: Lucky Streak Vol. II (1994, Songs: "Danger", "Dirty")Aciarium: The Heavy Metal Superstars (1996)Re-Vision: Longevity (2001) (Song: "Larvae")Spearfish: Back, for the Future (2003) (Song: "Justice In Ontario")Destruction: Inventor of Evil (2005) (Song: "The Alliance of Hellhoundz")Michael Schenker Group: Heavy Hitters (2005) (Song: "Hair Of The Dog")Ira: Gloria Eterna (2008) (Song: "Marshall Lockjaw")Mantra: Building: Hell (2010) (Song: "Master Of My Life")Attick Demons: Atlantis (2011, Song: "Atlantis")Legions Of Crows: Stab Me (2011) (Song: "Coventry Carol")Så Jävla Metal: The History of Swedish Hard Rock and Heavy Metal (2011 Film) (Song: "Så Jävla Metal")Wolfpakk: Wolfpakk (2011) (Song: "The Crow")Prassein Aloga: Midas Touch (2011, "See the Bodies" und "Flesh of Life")Layla Milou: Reborn (2012) (Song: "You Own Control")Scelerata: The Sniper (2012) (Guest vocals, co-writing, composing)Rushmore: Kingdom Of Demons (2013)Red Dragon Cartel: Wasted (2014)Hollywood Monsters: Big Trouble (2014, bonus track: "Fuck you all")Odium: The Science Of Dying (2014) (Song: "Die With Pride")Maiden United: Remembrance (2015) (Song: "Prowler")Mikael Fassberg: Lazy Sunday (2015)Coffee Overdrive: Rocket L(A)unch (2015) (Song: "To The Top")United Artists Against Terrorism: Heroes (2016)Ibridoma: December (2016) (Song: "I'm a Bully")Mikael Fassberg: All or Nothing (2017)AirForce (UK): Black Box Recordings Volume 2 (2018)'' (Song: "Sniper")

See also 
List of new wave of British heavy metal bands
Blaze Bayley

References

External links 

 Official website
 
 
 Interview at RockSomething
 Paul Di'Anno: 30 Years of the Beast

1958 births
Iron Maiden members
English heavy metal singers
English rock singers
English baritones
Living people
Gogmagog (band) members
People from Chingford
Prisoners and detainees of the United Kingdom
English fraudsters
English punk rock singers
Metal Mind Productions artists
English people of Brazilian descent
English people of Italian descent